Private Tomás Mateo Claudio (1892–1918) was a Filipino soldier who enlisted in the U.S. Army during the First World War. He was considered as the first Filipino to die overseas in the midst of an international conflict.

Early life and career
He was born on May 7, 1892 to Gregorio Claudio, a violinist, and Pelagia Mateo, a seamstress. He already showed bravery and an inclination for military service and adventure as a young boy. Although he was quite stubborn, his cheerful disposition endeared him to his friends and classmates at the school.

In a military exercise in his school, Claudio showed signs of a great military officer as he was given the rank of battalion commander because he was the most outstanding captain of Company A. However, his father died in 1907. He eventually finished his elementary education but failed to finished high school. He later became a guard at the Bureau of Prisons but was dismissed from the job in 1911 because of dereliction of duty, that is, sleeping on the job. He soon left the country and went to Hawaii to work in a sugar plantation. He later went to Alaska to work in the salmon canneries there. After all those, he went to Reno, Nevada where he finished commerce at Clark Healds Business College in 1916. Upon graduating, he accepted a clerkship at the City Post Office.

World War I
It was on April 6, 1917 when the United States entered the war against the Central Powers, who were battling the Allies in trench warfare. In this case, the Philippine Assembly formed the Philippine National Guard as a contribution to the American Expeditionary Force contingent to provide support to the war-weary Allied forces. Able Filipino males who came from the Philippines to work as contract workers in the Hawaiian sugar, pineapple plantations and other industries were required to register in the U.S. military drafts of June 5, 1917, June 5, 1918 and September 12, 1918. Some volunteered, others were drafted. Most of them served in Schofield Barracks, Ft. Shafter and Hawaiian National Guard from the ranks of private to sergeant

Claudio decided to apply in the U.S. Army. After being denied twice, he was finally enlisted on November 2, 1917.  He became a member of the 41st Infantry Division and left for Europe on December 15.  His last destination was France, where he served, initially, in the trenches of the Toul Sector and, later, with the reserve division near Paris. Subsequently, he was assigned to the Montdidier front.

Death
Under the leadership of General John Pershing, the Americans held their ground from repeated German attacks. Private Claudio took part in these crucial battles in the Marne Offensive. Artillery shells pounded "No Man's Land", barbed wires left mutilated hands and gunpowder and blood mixed together. In the ensuing battle, Private Claudio was killed by enemy fire on June 29, 1918 in Château-Thierry, France. He was the only Filipino to die in World War I.

Legacy
The Tomas Claudio Memorial Elementary School, founded in 1921, and the Tomas Claudio Colleges, founded in 1950, both in Morong, Rizal, Philippines, were named in his honor.
Tomas Claudio Street, first constructed in the late 1920s under the US Insular Government of the Philippines, is named after him. Similar streets in some cities or municipalities also bear such name.

References

 Rizal News Online (RNO)

American military personnel killed in World War I
Filipino military personnel
1892 births
1918 deaths
Burials at the Manila North Cemetery
United States Army personnel of World War I
United States Army soldiers